The 2008–09 Illinois Fighting Illini men's basketball team represented University of Illinois at Urbana–Champaign in the 2008–09 NCAA Division I men's basketball season.  This was head coach Bruce Weber's sixth season at Illinois.

Roster

2008 recruiting class

Schedule

|-
!colspan=12 style=|Exhibition
           

|-
!colspan=12 style=|Non-conference regular season

|-
!colspan=12 style=|Conference Regular Season 

|-
!colspan=12 style=|Big Ten tournament 

|-
!colspan=12 style=|NCAA Tournament

Rankings

Season statistics

References

Illinois
Illinois
Illinois Fighting Illini men's basketball seasons
Illinois
Illinois